A microlith is a small stone tool from 35,000 to about 3,000 years ago.

Microlith may also refer to:

 Microlith (catalytic reactor)

See also
Microlithography
 Microlithosia, synonym of Paralithosia, a genus of moths